Barbara Klemm (born 27 December 1939 in Münster) is a German press photographer. She worked for Frankfurter Allgemeine Zeitung for 45 years. 
She photographed many of the most important events in recent German history and has received honors, including Fellowship of the Academy of Arts, Berlin and the Pour le Mérite. She was inducted into the Leica Hall of Fame in recognition of her status as "a driving force in reportage photography" and as "an exemplary photographer".

Early life
She was born in Münster and grew up in Karlsruhe.

Her father Fritz Klemm was a painter and a professor at the Academy of Fine Arts, Karlsruhe.

Career
In 1959 she moved to Frankfurt to work for the Frankfurter Allgemeine Zeitung (FAZ), for which she worked until 2004. As a press photographer she photographed events including the 1969 student riots in Frankfurt, Heinrich Böll protesting against nuclear weapons in 1983, the 1969 celebrations in Cuba for the tenth anniversary of the revolution, the first democratic elections held in Portugal in 25 April 1975, and the fall of the Berlin Wall in 1989.

She has photographed many celebrities, including Mick Jagger, Tom Waits, Claudio Abbado, Simon Rattle, György Ligeti, Andy Warhol, and Rainer Werner Fassbinder. Her famous photographs include Soviet general secretary Leonid Brezhnev kissing East German leader Erich Honecker in 1979. Throughout her life she has consistently used black-and-white analog (film) photography, typically single photographs rather than series.

Exhibitions
 Barbara Klemm. Photographs 1968 – 2013, Martin-Gropius-Bau, Berlin, 2013–2014

Awards
She is a Fellow of the Academy of Arts, Berlin and an honorary professor at Darmstadt University of Applied Sciences. She received the Dr. Erich Salomon Prize in 1989, the Pour le Mérite for Sciences and Arts in 2010 and the Leica Hall of Fame award in 2012.

References

External links
 The main works of Barbara Klemm

1939 births
Living people
Photographers from North Rhine-Westphalia
German women photographers
Members of the Academy of Arts, Berlin
Recipients of the Pour le Mérite (civil class)
Frankfurter Allgemeine Zeitung people
People from Münster